2018 Varsity Rugby was the 2018 edition of four rugby union competitions annually played between several university teams in South Africa. It was contested from 29 January to 16 April 2018 and was the eleventh edition of these competitions.

Varsity Cup

All these teams also played in the competition in 2017.

Varsity Shield

All these teams also played in the competition in 2017.

Promotion/relegation play-offs

2019 Varsity Cup play-off

CUT Ixias won 37–31 to retain their place in the Varsity Cup for 2019, while the WSU All Blacks remained in the Varsity Shield competition.

2019 Varsity Shield play-off

Rhodes won 44–5 to retain their place in the Varsity Shield for 2019.

Young Guns

Competition rules

There were nine participating universities in the 2018 Young Guns competition, the Under-20 sides of each of the nine Varsity Cup teams. These teams were divided into three regionalised sections and each team played every team in their section twice over the course of the season, once at home and once away.

Teams received four points for a win and two points for a draw. Bonus points were awarded to teams that scored four or more tries in a game, as well as to teams that lost a match by eight points or less. Teams were ranked by log points, then points difference (points scored less points conceded).

The three section winners qualified for the semi-finals, along with the runner-up with the best record.

Teams

Young Guns North

Log

The final standings for the 2018 Varsity Cup Young Guns North were:

  qualified for the semifinals as section winners.

Matches

The following matches were played in the 2018 Varsity Cup Young Guns North:

Young Guns Central

Log

The final standings for the 2018 Varsity Cup Young Guns Central were:

  qualified for the semifinals as section winners and  qualified for the semifinals as the runner-up with the best record across the three sections.

Matches

The following matches were played in the 2018 Varsity Cup Young Guns Central:

Young Guns South

Log

The final standings for the 2018 Varsity Cup Young Guns South were:

  qualified for the semifinals as section winners.

Matches

The following matches were played in the 2018 Varsity Cup Young Guns South:

Semi-finals

Final

Res Rugby

Competition rules

There were nine participating teams in the 2018 Res Rugby competition — the new name for the competition formerly known as the Koshuis Rugby Championship — the winners of the internal leagues of each of the nine Varsity Cup teams. These teams were divided into two divisions (a Championship division with five teams and a Premiership division with four teams) and each team played every team in their division once over the course of the season, either at home or away.

Teams received four points for a win and two points for a draw. Bonus points were awarded to teams that scored four or more tries in a game, as well as to teams that lost a match by eight points or less. Teams were ranked by log points, then points difference (points scored less points conceded).

The top two teams in the Championship qualified for the final.

Teams

Championship

Log

The final standings for the 2018 Res Rugby Championship were:

 Patria (Pukke) and Vishuis (Shimlas) qualified for the final.

Matches

The following matches were played in the 2018 Res Rugby Championship:

Final

Premiership

Log

The final standings for the 2018 Res Rugby Premiership were:

Matches

The following matches were played in the 2018 Res Rugby Championship:

See also

 Varsity Cup
 2017 Varsity Cup
 2017 Varsity Shield
 2017 Gold Cup

References

External links
 

2018
2018 in South African rugby union
2018 rugby union tournaments for clubs